al-Nahr, was a Palestinian village  northeast of Acre. It was depopulated in May 1948 after a military assault carried out by the Carmeli Brigade as part of the Israel Defense Forces's Operation Ben-Ami. Immediately after the assault, the village of al-Nahr was razed.

History
The twin villages of al-Nahr and nearby al-Tall were both sites of ancient settlements atop the tel of Kabri. Recent excavations indicate habitation back to the sixth millennium BC.

Ottoman era

In the Ottoman period, the village appeared under the name of El Qahweh in Pierre Jacotin´s map from 1799.
In 1875, the French explorer Victor Guérin visited the village, which he called El Kahoueh. He found it to have 120 inhabitants, all Muslims.

In 1881 the PEF's Survey of Western Palestine described the village, then named El Kahweh, as a "stone village, containing about 250 Moslems, [] situated on the plain, surrounded by figs, olives, mulberries, and pomegranates; there is a spring and flowing stream at this village."

A population list from about 1887 showed that el Kahweh had 370 inhabitant; all Muslims.

British Mandate era
In the 1922 census of Palestine conducted by the British Mandate authorities, Al Nahr wa Tal had a population of 422; 3 Bahai, the rest Muslim. In the 1931 census, Al-Nahr had 522 Muslim inhabitants, in a total of 120 houses.

In villagers of Al-Nahr lived principally of agriculture and animal husbandry. In the 1945 statistics it had a population of 610 Muslims, with 5,261 dunams of land. A total of 2,066 dunums was used for citrus and bananas, 1,094 dunums were allotted to cereals, 1,937 dunums were irrigated or used for orchards, of which 30 dunums were planted in olive trees, while 28 dunams were built-up land.

1948 war

On March 27, 1948, hundreds of armed villagers and units of the Arab Liberation Army attacked a Jewish convoy near Kabri, killing forty-nine Jews. Six Arabs were also killed in the battle. Two months later the commander of Operation Ben-Ami gave operational orders given that day were to "attack with the aim of capturing, the villages of Kabri, Umm al Faraj and Al-Nahr, to kill the men [and] to destroy and set fire to the villages." Benvenisti states that "the orders were carried out to the letter", while Morris writes that a number of villagers were apparently executed.

Israeli period
Following the war the area was incorporated into the State of Israel. The kibbutz of Kabri was founded the following year and uses land that had belonged to al-Nahr. The moshav Ben Ami, named after the fallen commander of an attack on nearby Nahariyya, was also established on the village's land. In 1992, the village site was described as "Only two houses remain, and one of them is partially destroyed. A tall date-palm tree grows on the village site, which is overgrown by wild grasses, a few cactuses, and fig trees. The cemetery, on the western side of the village contains one identifiable grave. The nearby Fawwara spring has been fenced in and declared private property."

See also
Depopulated Palestinian locations in Israel

References

Bibliography

 
 

Morris, B., (second edition 2004 third printing 2006) The Birth Of The Palestinian Refugee Problem Revisited, Cambridge University Press,

External links
Welcome to al-Nahr
al-Nahr, Zochrot
Survey of Western Palestine, Map 3: IAA, Wikimedia commons 
Hussein Mubaraki: Because They Wanted the Land, WREMEA, May–June 2008

Arab villages depopulated during the 1948 Arab–Israeli War
District of Acre
1948 disestablishments in Mandatory Palestine